The Isleños del Carmen Fútbol Club, commonly known as Isleños, was a Mexican football club based in Ciudad del Carmen. The club was founded in 2017, and played in the Serie B of Liga Premier.

Players

Current squad

References 

Association football clubs established in 2017
Campeche
2017 establishments in Mexico
Liga Premier de México